The 1969 Cork Senior Hurling Championship was the 81st staging of the Cork Senior Hurling Championship since its establishment by the Cork County Board in 1887. The championship began on 13 April 1969 and ended on 21 September 1969.

St. Finbarr's entered the championship as the defending champions, however, they were beaten by University College Cork in the quarter-finals.

The final was played on 21 September 1969 at the Athletic Grounds in Cork between Glen Rovers and University College Cork, in what was their first meeting in a final in seven years. Glen Rovers won the match by 4-16 to 1-13 to claim their 22nd championship title overall and their first title since 1967.

Team changes

To Championship

Promoted from the Cork Intermediate Hurling Championship
 St. Vincent's

Results

First round

 Passage received a bye in this round.

Quarter-finals

Semi-finals

Final

Championship statistics

Top scorers

Top scorers overall

References

Cork Senior Hurling Championship
Cork Senior Hurling Championship